Established at Duke University (North Carolina, United States) in 1987, the International Commission for Central American Recovery and Development (ICCARD) was a task force composed of 33 scholars and leaders (Ford Foundation 1988: 155).  The commission published its report, Poverty, Conflict, and Hope:  A Turning Point in Central America, in 1989 with principles for promoting peace, genuine democracy and equitable development in Central America.  Also known as the Sanford Commission Report (after U.S. Senator Terry Sanford, "the principal catalyst of the commission's work") the plan called for immediate action, regional and international cooperation based on learning from history (Zuvekas 2001: 128).  With numerous proposals for Central America over the years, the commission built upon past experiences.

The commission's recommendations represented the deliberations of an international body for regional democracy and development. With brief historical insights, from lessons learned the report's plan of action for a turning point in Central America is an easy to read guide for sustainable development and democracy.  The report itself, released "on the eve of the fourth meeting of the Central American Presidents", (Envio 1989) is also a valuable reference for analysis of the region and developments since the time of the commission.

Brief on the history
The report noted that the economic expansion following the Second World War is critical to understanding the historical roots of the crisis that Central America faced during the 1970s and 1980s, after the region's economy nearly collapsed from the inability to adjust to international structural changes. While the region averaged unprecedented growth from 1950 to 1978, the strengths of the economy in Central America did not outweigh the faults of exclusionary politics, flawed economic structures, decline of intra-regional trade, and external economic setbacks that consequently led to social unrest, violence and civil war.  While Zuvekas (2001: 128-120) maintains that the report "does not sufficiently recognize the (admittedly limited) progress" made throughout the 1980s, the commentator on the commission does believe the "ICCARD is fundamentally sound."  From the historical detail on the civil strife that uprooted and caused suffering in the region for over ten years, the international commission then provided an immediate plan for action in order to attend to the social impact of the crisis.

The plan

The immediate plan to aid those in poverty is followed by a strategy for sustainable development, including the revival of productivity and production, assuring the creation of employment, the development of human resources, fiscal and monetary reform as well as strategy to conserve natural resources.  In sequencing the plan, fiscal reform is noted as a fundamental step to finance the recovery of human resource development from positive, real returns of hard-earned profit.  With recognition of the difficulties in sustaining democratic governance in the region, the report then discusses building democracy as inseparable from development.  The plan for building democracy consists of broadening participation in civil society, advocating respect for human rights with tolerance to instill values of democracy and peace.  

The international commission report stresses that the fragile institutions representing the interests of those excluded from political processes, the minimal financial resources for mobilizing to provide for the poorest in society, and the perceptions of those who hold power are obstacles to progressive reform.  At this point, the report as it was presented addressed the developmental needs of the region rather than on a country-by-country basis, allowing for the "development of more comprehensive policies" (Envivo 1989).  The plan to promote democracy thus involves strategy for civilian rule and civil-military relations where:  "security is not achieved by repression and military dominance of government.  Continued withdrawal of the military from the political scene, their training in democratic political values, the rejection of authoritarian doctrines of national security, and the development of effective mechanisms of civilian political control," is critical Central American societies (ICCARD 1989: 61).  The commission's plan advises from the need for economic and social justice with a strong role in developing democracy through nongovernmental organizations and the support of the media.

For sustainable democracy, the report maintains regional institutions and cooperation are essential, noting The Central American Parliament, The Central American Economic and Social Council, as well as The Central American Court of Justice are vital to facilitating regional integration.  The vision of regional economic planning accordingly "rests on an assumption that political dialogue is the means to resolve both internal and regional conflicts" (Envio 1989). Historical factions related to integration are detailed, including the central challenges to rebuilding the Free Trade Zone under the "conditionality" of World Bank, the International Monetary Fund, and the U.S. Agency for International Development structural adjustment programs.  The commission suggests that while there are favorable conditions for regional investment and cooperation, the intra-regional debt also remains a major obstacle.

If integration is to be sustainable and successful, regional institutions must be strengthened, particularly the Central American Bank for Economic Integration and the Secretariat of the Central American Monetary Council.  The strengthening of these institutions is essential to achieving economic cooperation – or "acting together internationally" in the words of the report – which requires an institutional coherence that the commission suggests the European Community is, "with it long experience in developing regional structures, in an excellent position to provide expertise" (ICCARD 1989: 76).  To maintain international cooperation, the report addresses the conditions for any support to promote trade, advance technology in the region and open markets for Central American exports to revive the intra-regional economy.  Markets must provide for the modernization of regional technology and financial flows need be devoted to domestic reforms, debt reduction and restructuring.  Finally, the report advises for a coordinated diversification of foreign assistance based on performance conditions.

Conclusion

Anticipating a future turning point toward sustainable development and authentic democratic institutions in Central America, the commission concludes with statement that the recommendations documented are drawn from principles of democratic development by understanding problems of the past in light of the recent history of the region.  Commentators such as Zuvekas (2001: 125) maintains some of the report (actually, assembled from essays by key Central American scholars) is disappointing, and Envivo (1989) notes issues such as land reform remained untouched.  Nonetheless, the report is a reasonable analysis of the difficulties facing the region with authoritative perspectives for the direction domestic governments, international organizations and the overall Central American political economy need undertake to ensure recovery in the region.  The Report of the International Commission for Central American Recovery and Development is a valuable guide for case study and application of theory based upon history with hope for the future of the region.

Developments since

 Esquipulas II:  Internet searches, even further scholarly research reveal little.  Nonetheless, Envio (1989) reports that following the presentation of the report on the eve of the fourth meeting of Central American presidents, the European Economic Community (EEC) responded positively with satisfaction for the peace process undertaken.  The summit resulted in the Esquipulas II framework for regional development, peace and cooperation.  The report claims that the "Stanford Commission Report, the presidential summit and the EEC meeting have opened a new space in Central American politics" (Envio 1989).  While the Esquipulas Peace Agreement isolates the United States, the EEC continued with its support in Central America by increasing foreign aid with the dismantling and resettling of Honduras' contra troops in February 1989, showing progress for regional diplomacy.

References
 The Report of the International Commission for Central American Recovery and Development:  Poverty, Conflict, and Hope – A Turning Point in Central America. (1989). Durham and London:  Duke University Press.
 Envio Team. 1989, April. "EEC Applauds Central American Initiative." Number 95, Envio.
 Ford Foundation. 1988. "Ford Foundation Annual Report 1988."  Retrieved February 2007
 Zuvekas, C. 2001. "Alternative Perspectives on Central American Economic Recovery and Development." Latin American Research Review.

Further reading

 Baum, J., Ed. 2005. The Blackwell Companion to Organizations. Cambridge, MA: Blackwell Publishers.
 Germain, R.D., Ed. 2000. Globalization and its critics.  New York:  St. Martin's Press. 
 Keohane, R.O. 1970. "Central American Integration:  The Paradox of Success." International Organization, Vol. 24, No. 2, 319-334.
 Keohane, R.O. 1986. Neorealism and its critics. New York:  Columbia University Press. 
 Mansfield, E.D. 2002. "Democratic Transitions, Institutional Strength, and War. International Organization, Vol. 56, No. 2, pp. 297–337, (also available online).
 Pease, K. 2006. International Organizations:  Perspectives on Governance in the Twenty-First Century. Upper Saddle River:  Prentice Hall.
 Robinson, W.I. 2003. Transnational Conflicts:  Central America, Social Change, and Globalization. London: Verso.
 Vaden, H.E. & Prevost, G, Eds. 2005. Politics of Latin America:  The Power Game. United States:  Oxford University Press.
 Whitman, J. 2005. "Human Systems and Global Governance." Systems Research and Behavioral Science, No. 33, pp. 311–317.
 Latin American Research Review. In particular, Latin American Research Review, Vol. 27, No. 1 (1992), pp. 125–150

See also

International development

International organizations based in the Americas
International development organizations
Political science organizations
Organizations established in 1987
Organizations based in North Carolina
Duke University